The Arga-Tas is a mountain range in far North-eastern Russia. Administratively it is part of the Sakha Republic (Yakutia), Russian Federation. The range extends along the southwestern part of the Upper Kolyma District. The village of Utaya, administrative center of the Utainsky Rural Okrug is located at the feet of the range.

Geography
The Arga-Tas is a subrange of the Chersky Range mountain system. It extends from NNW to SSE for almost  at the southern end of the Moma Range and west of the Kolyma River valley. The Rassokha, a tributary of the Yasachnaya River, cuts across the range in its middle course.

See also
List of ultras of Northeast Asia

References

External links
Ultras of Siberia - Peakbagger.com
Danchik-1 › Блог › Открытие в себе Верхнеколымского района. 1 часть. (Views of the area from the air)
Mountain ranges of the Sakha Republic
Chersky Range